Georgie Robertson Stone  is an Australian actress, writer and transgender rights advocate. At the age of 10, Stone was the youngest person to receive hormone blockers in Australia, which set a precedent that eventually changed the law that compelled transgender children and their families to apply to the Family Court of Australia to access stage one treatment. She continues to advocate for transgender children, and is one of the most visible transgender people in Australia.

Early life
Georgie Stone was born to parents Greg Stone and Rebekah Robertson. Stone attended Elwood College 2013-2018 and was co-school captain in 2018. Stone began studying a Bachelor of Arts at The University of Melbourne in 2019.

Career

Activism

In 2014, Stone appeared on Four Corners, talking about her experiences in court and changing the law surrounding stage one treatment. In February 2016, Stone and a number of other families of transgender kids travelled to Canberra to speak with politicians about changing the law. Stone and her mother were interviewed on The Project in response to the controversy surrounding the Safe Schools Coalition and the importance of the program. Later that year, Stone and her family appeared on Australian Story, telling their story.  

Stone started a petition on change.org in August 2016, rallying support for law reform. Stone has also spoken out in support of transgender kids being allowed to use the bathroom of their choice, the importance of the Safe Schools Coalition, and the Pride Centre located in St Kilda.

Stone was announced as a judge at the 2017 GLOBE Community Awards. Stone also featured in the ABC Me television series, Advice to My 12-Year-Old-Self, which aired on 11 October in celebration of the United Nation's International Day of the Girl. The show consists of 37 interviews, all lasting two minutes in length, of prominent Australian women. In late 2017, Stone was made the official ambassador for the Royal Children's Hospital Gender Service in Melbourne.

In 2018, Stone became the ambassador for the Human Rights Arts and Film Festival, Wear it Purple Day and the AFL Pride Game. In 2019, Stone was named an Ambassador for The Pinnacle Foundation. 

In June 2022, a 28-minute documentary about her own life, titled The Dreamlife of Georgie Stone, written by Stone and directed by Maya Newell, had its world premiere at  the Tribeca Film Festival in New York City and then its Australian premiere at Sydney Film Festival. The film was co-produced by Stone, Newell, Sophie Hyde, and others. It was released worldwide on Netflix  on 22 September 2022.

Acting
In March 2019, Stone joined Australian television soap opera Neighbours in the guest role of Mackenzie Hargreaves. She plays the first ever transgender character on the show, having pitched the role to the show's producers a year earlier. Stone began filming her scenes in June, with the episodes to be aired later in the year. Stone described Mackenzie as "a bit world weary, a bit cynical, a bit hardened by her experiences". She also described her as "sweet, compassionate and lovely" when she opens up to other people. 

In September 2019, it was announced that Stone would appear in a spin-off titled Neighbours: Erinsborough High, reprising her role from the main show. The series was released on My5 and 10 Play in November, and comprised five episodes that "explore issues universally troubling teens today – bullying, mental illness, sexuality, cultural diversity, parental and peer pressure, and teacher-student relationships". On 19 October 2019, it was announced that Stone would be promoted to the regular cast in early 2020. She co-wrote an episode of Neighbours with executive producer Jason Herbison, which aired in July 2020. 

For her performance, Stone was nominated for 'Best Daytime Star' at the 2020 Inside Soap Awards.

Personal life
Stone lives in Melbourne, Australia. She has a twin brother. Stone commenced taking puberty blocking treatment in 2011, the youngest in Australia to commence stage-one treatment (she was 10 at the time). In 2015, she commenced hormone replacement therapy, at age 15. Since 2014, Stone has been public about her gender identity.

Filmography

Film

Television

Awards and recognition 
 2016: GLBTI Person of the Year from the GLOBE Community Awards, the youngest ever recipient

 2016: Making a Difference award from the Anti-Defamation Commission, the youngest ever recipient

 2016: featured in the list of "25 LGBTI Australians to Watch in 2017" by the Gay News Network 
 2018: Young Australian of the Year in Victoria 
2017: Winner of the Human Rights Awards 
 2020: Medal of the Order of Australia, the youngest person to be recognised that year

See also
 List of transgender people
 Transgender rights in Australia

References

2000 births
Australian people of English descent
Living people
Australian LGBT actors
Australian LGBT rights activists
Recipients of the Medal of the Order of Australia
Transgender rights activists
Transgender actresses
Australian twins
Twin actors
Actresses from Melbourne